Brad Robert Wenstrup (born June 17, 1958) is an American politician, U.S. Army Reserve officer, and doctor of podiatric medicine, who has been the U.S. representative for  since 2013. A Republican, he upset incumbent U.S. Representative Jean Schmidt to win the 2012 Republican primary election.

Wenstrup is a colonel in the U.S. Army Reserve and an Iraq War veteran. After the shooting of Congressman Steve Scalise on June 14, 2017, Wenstrup attended to Scalise until he was transported to MedStar Washington Hospital Center. For his actions during the shooting, he was awarded the Soldier's Medal.

Early life, education, and medical career
Wenstrup was born and raised in Cincinnati, Ohio, the son of Joan (née Carletti) and Frank John "Jack" Wenstrup. His father was of German, Irish, and English descent, and his mother was of Italian ancestry. He has a sister, Amy Castellini.

In 1976, Wenstrup graduated from St. Xavier High School in Cincinnati. In 1980, he graduated Omicron Delta Kappa and cum laude with a B.A. in psychology from the University of Cincinnati, where he was a member of the Sigma Alpha Epsilon fraternity. He then attended the Scholl College of Podiatric Medicine of Rosalind Franklin University of Medicine and Science, where he earned an B.S. in biology and a Doctor of Podiatric Medicine degree, graduating in 1985.

Career 
Wenstrup practiced podiatric medicine in Cincinnati for more than 24 years before being elected to Congress.

Military service
Wenstrup joined the United States Army Reserve in 1998, attaining the rank of colonel in March 2017. In 2005 and 2006, he served a tour in Iraq with the 344th Combat Support Hospital. He called his deployment "the worst thing that ever happened to me and the best thing I ever got to do." Wenstrup was awarded the Bronze Star Medal and Combat Action Badge.

During Wenstrup's tour of duty in Iraq, his sister asked what she could send him. He told her, "I wear the same clothes everyday, we're fed, and most days I'm not leaving the base. But the people here have nothing. They were under an oppressed regime and have had nothing for so long." His sister helped organize donations of toys, school supplies, and hygiene supplies donated by local companies, and Wenstrup worked with the base chaplain to distribute the donations to the locals.

2009 Cincinnati mayoral election

Wenstrup ran for mayor of Cincinnati against incumbent Democrat Mark Mallory in 2009. Mallory defeated Wenstrup, 54% to 46%.

U.S. House of Representatives

Elections
2012

Wenstrup ran for the U.S. House of Representatives in the newly redrawn Ohio's 2nd congressional district, held by incumbent Republican U.S. Congresswoman Jean Schmidt. He was endorsed by the Anderson Tea Party and the Ohio Liberty Council, a coalition of Ohio Tea Party groups. In a surprise, he defeated Schmidt in the March Republican primary, 49% to 43%. She carried six counties (all in the district's eastern part), while Wenstrup won the two most populous counties (both in the western part): Hamilton County and Clermont County.

In the general election, Wenstrup defeated Democratic nominee William R. Smith, 59%–41%.

2014

Wenstrup was reelected, defeating Democratic nominee Marek Tyszkiewicz 66%–34%.

2016

Wenstrup was reelected to a third term, defeating Democratic candidates William Smith and Janet Everhard 65%–32.82%–2.17%.

2018
Wenstrup defeated Democratic candidate Jill Schiller, 58% to 41%, to win election to a fourth term.

2020

Wenstrup defeated Democratic candidate Jaime Castle, 61% to 39%, to win a fifth term.

Tenure
Wenstrup began his first term on January 3, 2013. During his first year in office he held an open town hall meeting in each of his congressional district's eight counties.

In 2013 Wenstrup's office conducted a customer service survey. According to Roll Call, very few congressional offices have conducted "genuine" surveys of constituents, instead surveying with "loaded" questions designed to achieve certain results. According to the survey, 75% of respondents were "satisfied" or "very satisfied" with their experience with Wenstrup's office.

Wenstrup was an original co-sponsor of H.R. 3949, the VA Prescription Data Accountability Act 2017, which became law during the 115th Congress, in 2017. The bill helps protect veterans receiving prescription medications and prevents misuse of such medications.

Texas v. Pennsylvania

In December 2020, Wenstrup was one of 126 Republican members of the House of Representatives to sign an amicus brief in support of Texas v. Pennsylvania, a lawsuit filed at the United States Supreme Court contesting the results of the 2020 presidential election, in which Joe Biden defeated incumbent Donald Trump. The Supreme Court declined to hear the case on the basis that Texas lacked standing under Article III of the Constitution to challenge the results of an election held by another state.

Committee assignments
 Committee on Ways & Means
Subcommittee on Oversight
Subcommittee on Worker & Family Support
 United States House Permanent Select Committee on Intelligence
 Subcommittee on Defense Intelligence and Warfighter Support
 Subcommittee on Counterterrorism, Counterintelligence, and Counterproliferation

Caucus memberships
 Republican Study Committee
Air Cargo Caucus

Personal life
Wenstrup is married to Monica Wenstrup (Klein), who works as a financial consultant. They have two children. They adopted a daughter in 2019.

Wenstrup's niece Anne Marie Gieske was one of the two American victims of the Seoul Halloween crowd crush.

References

External links
Congressman Brad Wenstrup official U.S. House website
Brad Wenstrup for Congress

 

|-

1958 births
Living people
20th-century American physicians
21st-century American physicians
21st-century American politicians
United States Army personnel of the Iraq War
American military doctors
American people of English descent
American people of German descent
American people of Irish descent
American people of Italian descent
American podiatrists
Military personnel from Ohio
Physicians from Ohio
Recipients of the Soldier's Medal
St. Xavier High School (Ohio) alumni
United States Army colonels
United States Army reservists
Republican Party members of the United States House of Representatives from Ohio